The Xi'an–Yan'an railway or Xiyan railway, is a railroad in Shaanxi Province of China between Xi'an, the provincial capital, and Yan'an. Major cities and counties along route include Xi'an, Ganquan, Fu County, Huangling, Yijun, Baishui County, Pucheng County and Yan'an.

The line will be paralleled by the Xi'an–Yan'an high-speed railway.

Rail connections
Xi'an: Longhai railway, Houma–Xi'an railway, Nanjing–Xi'an railway, Xi'an–Ankang railway
 Yan'an: Shenmu–Yan'an railway

See also

 List of railways in China

References

Railway lines in China
Rail transport in Shaanxi
Railway lines opened in 1997